Luokan is a village in the town of Hongmao in Qiongzhong Li and Miao Autonomous County, in the centre of Hainan, located  west of the county seat and just south of China National Highway 224.

References

External links

Populated places in Hainan